Cristina García (born July 4, 1958) is a Cuban-born American journalist and novelist. Her first novel Dreaming in Cuban (1992) was a finalist for the National Book Award. She has since published her novels The Agüero Sisters (1997) and Monkey Hunting (2003), and has edited books of Cuban and other Latin American literature. A Handbook to Luck (2007) follows three children from Cuba, over twenty-six years through sacrifices and forced exiles.

In 2009, Garcia was hired as the visiting affiliate professor and Black Mountain Institute teaching fellow in creative writing at the University of Nevada, Las Vegas. She also taught at University of Texas-Austin, Texas Tech University, and Texas State University-San Marcos, where she is the 2012–2014 University Chair in Creative Writing. García's novels celebrate the memories, fantasies, and body rituals of her Cuban heritage and that of the diaspora in the United States.

Biography 
García was born in Havana to a Guatemalan father, Francisco M. Garcia and Cuban mother, Esperanza Lois. In 1961, when she was two years old, her family was among the first wave of people to flee Cuba after Fidel Castro came to power. They moved to New York City, where she was raised in Queens, Brooklyn Heights, and Manhattan. She earned a bachelor's degree in political science from Barnard College (1979) and a master's degree in international relations from the Johns Hopkins University School of Advanced International Studies (1981).  She has been a Guggenheim Fellow, a Hodder Fellow at Princeton University, and a recipient of the Whiting Writers Award. She is on the editorial advisory board of  Chiricú Journal: Latina/o Literatures, Arts, and Cultures. She has a daughter, Pilar.

Career

Journalism
After returning to the United States, García pursued a career in journalism, after having worked as a part-time "copy girl" with The New York Times. While at Johns Hopkins, she obtained an intern position with The Boston Globe and a job as a reporter for the Knoxville Journal. In 1983 she was hired by Time magazine. Beginning there as a reporter/researcher, she became the publication's San Francisco correspondent in 1985, and its bureau chief in Miami for Florida and the Caribbean region in 1987. In 1988 she was transferred to Los Angeles. She terminated her employment with Time to write fiction full-time in 1990.

Novels
Of García's first novel, Dreaming in Cuban, (1992) García said, "I surprised myself by how Cuban the book turned out to be. I don't remember growing up with a longing for Cuba, so I didn't realize how Cuban I was, how deep a sense I had of exile and longing." The book was nominated for the National Book Award.

Her second novel The Agüero Sisters (1997) won the Janet Heidiger Kafka Prize.

García has reported experiencing unease in relating to other Cubans—both with those still in Cuba and those in exile in Florida. Some question why she writes in English. Others take issue with her lack of engagement in anti-Castro causes. She has said she attempts to emphasize in her novels the fact that "there is no one Cuban exile". In 2007 she also said that she "wanted to break free of seeing the world largely through the eyes of Cubans or Cuban immigrants. After the first three novels—I think of them as a loose trilogy—I wanted to tackle a bigger canvas, more far-flung migrations, the fascinating work of constructing identity in an increasingly small and fractured world." At this time García described this "bigger canvas" as including "the entrapments and trappings of gender in my novel", partly because "it would be easy, and overly simplistic, to frame everything in terms of equality, or cultural limitations, or other vivid measurables. What's most interesting to me are the slow, internal, often largely unconscious processes that move people in unexpected directions, that reframe and refine their own notions of who they are, sexually and otherwise."

While García has expressed a desire to move away from anti-Castro sentiments, the influence of her heritage is made clear when she discusses the symbolism and characters in her work. She has said, about the symbol of a tree, for example: In Afro-Cuban culture, the ceiba tree is also sacred, a kind of maternal, healing figure to which offerings are made, petitions placed. So absolutely, for me trees do represent a crossroads, an opportunity for redemption and change. In Dreaming in Cuban, Pilar Puente has a transformative experience under an elm tree that leads to her returning to Cuba. Chen Pan, in Monkey Hunting, escapes the sugarcane plantation under the watchful protection of a ceiba tree…In A Handbook to Luck, Evaristo takes to living in trees as a young boy, to escape the violence of his stepfather. He stays there for years, first in a coral tree and then in a banyan. From his perches, he witnesses the greater violence of the civil war in El Salvador and speaks a peculiar poetry, born, in part, of his co-existence with trees.

"King of Cuba", is a darkly comic fictionalized portrait of Fidel Castro, an octogenarian exile, and a rabble of other Cuban voices who refuse to accept their power is ending.

Works
Dreaming in Cuban: A Novel (New York: Alfred A. Knopf, 1992) 
Cars of Cuba, essay, with photographer Joshua Greene and creator D. D. Allen (New York: H.N. Abrams, 1995. )
The Agüero Sisters (New York: Alfred A. Knopf, 1997. )
Monkey Hunting (New York: Alfred A. Knopf, 2003. )
Cubanisimo!: The Vintage Book of Contemporary Cuban Literature, editor and introduction (New York: Vintage Books, 2003. )
 "Introduction" to Twenty Love Poems and a Song of Despair by Pablo Neruda [1924] (New York: Penguin Classics, 2004. )
Bordering Fires: The Vintage Book of Contemporary Mexican and Chicano/a Literature, editor and introduction (New York: Vintage Books, 2006. )
A Handbook to Luck (New York: Alfred A. Knopf, 2007. )
The Lady Matador's Hotel: A Novel (Simon & Schuster, 2010. )
King of Cuba: A Novel (Scribner, 2013) 
Here In Berlin (Counterpoint, 2017)

Awards and honors
Dreaming in Cuban a finalist for the 1992 National Book Award
1996 Whiting Writers Award for fiction
1997 Janet Heidiger Kafka Prize for The Agüero Sisters
2008 Northern California Book Award for Fiction for A Handbook to Luck

See also 

List of Cuban American writers
 Cuban American literature
List of Cuban Americans

References

Bibliography
"About the Author" and "A Conversation with Cristina García" in The Agüero Sisters. Random House Publishing Group, 1998. .
Alvarez-Borland, Isabel. Cuban-American Literature of Exile: From Person to Persona. Charlottesville: University Press of Virginia, 1998.
Caminero-Santangelo, Marta, University of Kansas. "Cristina Garcia". The Literary Encyclopedia. 17 May 2005. The Literary Dictionary Company. (retrieved 14 March 2007)
Caminero-Santangelo, Marta. On Latinidad: U.s. Latino Literature and the Construction of Ethnicity. Gainesville: University Press of Florida, 2007.
Cox, Annabel. "Cristina García's Dreaming in Cuban: Latina literature and beyond?" Latino Studies 7.3 (Fall 2009): 357–377.
Dalleo, Raphael. "How Cristina Garcia Lost Her Accent, and Other Latina Conversations". Latino Studies 3.1 (April 2005): 3–18.
Dalleo, Raphael, and Elena Machado Sáez. "Latino/a Identity and Consumer Citizenship in Cristina Garcia's Dreaming in Cuban". The Latino/a Canon and the Emergence of Post-Sixties Literature. New York: Palgrave Macmillan, 2007. 107–132. https://web.archive.org/web/20131029193238/http://www.post-sixties.com/.
Johnson, Kelli Lyon. "Cristina Garcia - b. 1958". VG: Voices from the Gaps. May 9, 2005. (retrieved March 13, 2007)
Kevane, Bridget. Latino Literature in America. Westport: Greenwood Press, 2003.
Luis, William. Dance Between Two Cultures: Latino Caribbean Literature Written in the United States. Nashville: Vanderbilt University Press.com/articles/2007/05/16/features/arts_and_entertainment/doc464a9519e9ece723665622.txt article mentions Garcia's  2006 move to Napa, California] A Handbook to Luck May 16, 2007 (retrieved May 16, 2007)
Loustau, Laura R. "Cuerpos errantes: Literatura latina y latinoamericana en Estados Unidos. (On The Agüero Sisters).  Beatriz Viterbo Editora, Argentina. 2002. .
Viera, Joseph M. "Exile among Exiles: Cristina Garcia". Poets and Writers. September/October, 1998.

Further reading
 Davison, Ned J. (1971). Eduardo Barrios. Twayne Publishing

External links

Official Website
Profile at The Whiting Foundation

1958 births
Living people
20th-century American novelists
21st-century American novelists
American people of Guatemalan descent
American writers of Cuban descent
American women novelists
Barnard College alumni
Cuban emigrants to the United States
Cuban people of Guatemalan descent
People from Napa, California
Hispanic and Latino American novelists
Hispanic and Latino American women journalists
American women journalists
20th-century American women writers
21st-century American women writers
Journalists from California
Novelists from California
20th-century American non-fiction writers
21st-century American non-fiction writers
People from Brooklyn Heights